Pymble Ladies' College is an independent, non-selective, day and boarding school for girls, located in Pymble, a suburb on the Upper North Shore of Sydney, New South Wales, Australia.

History and description
Pymble Ladies' College was founded in 1916 by Dr John Marden, due to the increasing enrolments at the Presbyterian Ladies' College, Sydney, another school established by the General Assembly of the Presbyterian Church of NSW. The college, formerly a school of the Presbyterian Church of Australia, is now administered by the Uniting Church in Australia. Girls of any faith may attend the school, although they are expected to also attend a fortnightly chapel service. The school caters for all classes from Kindergarten to Year 12.

Twenty hectares in size, the grounds of the College feature a 50m swimming pool, gymnasium, several fields, tennis courts, an agriculture plot, library, buildings dedicated to specific subjects: an art building, a technology and applied studies building, a languages building, and a science block. There is also a music building, a chapel, healthcare centre, three boarding houses (Lang, Goodlet and Marden) and the most recent additions - the Gillian Moore Centre for Performing Arts in 2005, the Senior School Centre - Kate Mason Building in 2011, and the Centenary Sports Precinct in 2016.

There are eight houses in the secondary school, including the original three, Lang, Goodlet and Marden, and five more added in 2009, Wylie, Bennett, Ingleholme, Hammond and Thomas. There are three houses in the Preparatory and Junior Schools named after famous Australian authors, Gibbs (after May Gibbs), Mackellar (after Dorothea Mackellar) and Turner (after Ethel Turner). Recently, the preparatory and junior schools have transitioned into the eight houses of Marden, Lang, Goodlet, Wylie, Bennett, Ingleholme, Hammond and Thomas - Gibbs, Mackellar and Turner houses no longer exist after only 8 years in existence.

Activities
In 2014, the school participated in the Community Development and Leadership Summit in India, hosted by the Modern School, New Delhi.

Pymble Ladies' College is a founding member of the Association of Heads of Independent Girls' Schools (AHIGS).

Principals

Notable alumnae 

Entertainment, media and the arts
 Jenny Coupland – Miss Australia 1982
 Jacqueline McKenzie – actress, singer, artist
 Melissa Doyle – co-host of the Seven Network breakfast television programme Sunrise
 Dame Joan Hammond – soprano, singing coach and golfer
 Amber Higlett – finance presenter/reporter and newsreader, National Nine News
 Kerrie Lester – artist
 Amy Lyons - internet personality active in China
 Caroline Pemberton – Miss Australia 2007
Sarah Song – winner of Miss Sydney Chinese 2006 and Miss Chinese International 2007. She is currently working as an actress in TVB in Hong Kong.
 Anita Jacoby – TV and film producer (expelled)
 Alex the Astronaut – artist

Politics, public service and the law

Marie Byles – first female solicitor in New South Wales, mountaineer, explorer, author and feminist (also attended the Presbyterian Ladies' College, Sydney)
 Elizabeth Evatt – judge of an Australian federal court

Sport
 Sophie Ferguson – Professional Tennis Player
 Ellyse Perry – member of Australian women's national football team and cricket team
 Edwina Tops-Alexander – equestrian athlete representative to 2012 London Olympics
 Brittany O'Brien – Australian Olympic Diving Team 2016
 Chloe Dalton  – Australian Women's Rugby Sevens Team (2014–present), Olympic gold medallists
 Mackenzie Little- Olympic javelin thrower

See also 
 List of non-government schools in New South Wales
 List of boarding schools

Notes
  P.L.C council had acquired further land between 1916 and 1924. The reason for the sale is unknown.

References

Further reading
Coleman, M. 1991. This is Pymble College: The First 75 years, 1916-1991. Pymble Ladies' College.
 McFarlane, J. 1998. The Golden Hope: Presbyterian Ladies' College, 1888-1988. P.L.C Council, Presbyterian Ladies' College, Sydney. .

External links 
 Pymble Ladies' College website

Girls' schools in New South Wales
Boarding schools in New South Wales
Educational institutions established in 1916
Uniting Church schools in Australia
Rock Eisteddfod Challenge participants
Association of Heads of Independent Girls' Schools
Junior School Heads Association of Australia Member Schools
Private secondary schools in Sydney
Private primary schools in Sydney
Presbyterian schools in Australia
Pymble, New South Wales
Alliance of Girls' Schools Australasia
1916 establishments in Australia